Azio TV, also known as Asia Plus or Xingya, is a satellite cable channel operated by Era Television in Taiwan. The station has a Taiwan-specific channel and an "Asian market" channel. which provides broadcasting through pay TV in Hong Kong, Vietnam, Singapore, Malaysia and Indonesia.

See also
 Media of Taiwan

2001 establishments in Taiwan
Television stations in Taiwan
Television channels and stations established in 2001